Peroxisomal biogenesis factor 11 (PEX11)  are peroxisomal membrane proteins which promote peroxisome division in eukaryotic cells.

Human proteins from this family 
 PEX11A
 PEX11B
 PEX11G

References

Protein domains
Protein families
Membrane proteins